Adam Weinberg may refer to:

 Adam D. Weinberg, art museum curator and director
 Adam S. Weinberg (born 1965), American sociologist and academic administrator